The 2008 Calder Cup playoffs of the American Hockey League began on April 16, 2008. The sixteen teams that qualified, eight from each conference, played best-of-7 series for division semifinals, finals and conference finals.  The conference champions played a best-of-7 series for the Calder Cup. The Calder Cup Final ended on June 10, 2008 with the Chicago Wolves defeating the Wilkes-Barre/Scranton Penguins, four games to two, to win the second Calder Cup in team history. Jason Krog won the Jack A. Butterfield Trophy as playoff MVP, after having already been named the regular-season MVP. Krog also tied the AHL record for most assists in one playoff with 26.

In Game 5 of the East Division Semifinals between the Philadelphia Phantoms and Albany River Rats, Ryan Potulny of Philadelphia scored 2:58 into the fifth overtime period, ending what was longest game in AHL history. In 2018 a game would last until 6:48 into the fifth overtime period, setting a new record. Chicago's Darren Haydar set two AHL playoff scoring records in Game 2 of the Calder Cup Final by recording his 52nd career AHL playoff goal, as well as his 120th career AHL playoff point. In the same game, Wilkes-Barre/Scranton's Alex Goligoski set an AHL record for most points scored by a defenseman in a single post-season with 26. This eclipsed the record set by former Wilkes-Barre/Scranton defenseman Chris Kelleher, who scored 25 points in the 2001 Calder Cup Playoffs. Goligoski extended his record to 28 points before the playoffs ended.

Playoff seeds
After the 2007–08 AHL regular season, 16 teams qualified for the playoffs. The top four teams from each division qualified for the playoffs, except in the North division where the fourth playoff spot was taken by the fifth-placed team from the West division since the fifth-placed San Antonio Rampage earned more points than the Hamilton Bulldogs during the season. This is because the West division has 8 teams while the other three divisions have 7 teams each. Therefore, this was the only situation in which a crossover was possible. The Providence Bruins were the Eastern Conference regular season champions as well as the Macgregor Kilpatrick Trophy winners with the best overall regular season record. The Chicago Wolves were the Western Conference regular season champions.

Eastern Conference

Atlantic Division
Providence Bruins – Eastern Conference regular season champions; Macgregor Kilpatrick Trophy winners, 117 points
Hartford Wolf Pack – 110 points
Portland Pirates – 99 points
Manchester Monarchs – 88 points

East Division
Wilkes-Barre/Scranton Penguins – 101 points
Philadelphia Phantoms – 99 points
Albany River Rats – 93 points
Hershey Bears – 92 points

Western Conference

North Division
Toronto Marlies – 109 points
Syracuse Crunch – 100 points
Manitoba Moose – 99 points
San Antonio Rampage – 94 points (Fifth-place in West Division)

West Division
Chicago Wolves – Western Conference regular season champions, 111 points
Rockford IceHogs – 98 points
Houston Aeros – 96 points
Milwaukee Admirals – 95 points

Bracket

In each round the team that earned more points during the regular season receives home ice advantage, meaning they receive the "extra" game on home-ice if the series reaches the maximum number of games. There is no set series format due to arena scheduling conflicts and travel considerations.

Division Semifinals 
Note 1: All times are in Eastern Daylight Time (UTC−4).
Note 2: Game times in italics signify games to be played only if necessary.
Note 3: Home team is listed first.

Eastern Conference

Atlantic Division

(A1) Providence Bruins vs. (A4) Manchester Monarchs

(A2) Hartford Wolf Pack vs. (A3) Portland Pirates

East Division

(E1) Wilkes-Barre/Scranton Penguins vs. (E4) Hershey Bears

(E2) Philadelphia Phantoms vs. (E3) Albany River Rats 

Game five was the longest game in AHL history at the time at 82 minutes, 58 seconds of overtime play. It is now the second longest game in AHL history. Philadelphia's Michael Leighton faced 101 shots and made 98 saves, which remains the AHL record.

Western Conference

North Division

(N1) Toronto Marlies vs. (W5) San Antonio Rampage

(N2) Syracuse Crunch vs. (N3) Manitoba Moose

West Division

(W1) Chicago Wolves vs. (W4) Milwaukee Admirals

(W2) Rockford IceHogs vs. (W3) Houston Aeros

Division Finals

Eastern Conference

Atlantic Division

(A1) Providence Bruins vs. (A3) Portland Pirates

East Division

(E1) Wilkes-Barre/Scranton Penguins vs. (E2) Philadelphia Phantoms

Western Conference

North Division

(N1) Toronto Marlies vs. (N2) Syracuse Crunch

West Division

(W1) Chicago Wolves vs. (W2) Rockford IceHogs

Conference finals

Eastern Conference

(E1) Wilkes-Barre/Scranton Penguins vs. (A3) Portland Pirates

Western Conference

(W1) Chicago Wolves vs. (N1) Toronto Marlies

Calder Cup Final

(W1) Chicago Wolves vs. (E1) Wilkes-Barre/Scranton Penguins

See also
2007–08 AHL season
List of AHL seasons

References

Calder Cup
Calder Cup playoffs